Ramananda Das (1913-1972) was an Indian politician. He was elected to the Lok Sabha, lower house of the Parliament of India from Barrackpore, West Bengal as a member of the Indian National Congress. He was a social worker and trade union leader. He represented India in ILO Conferences, at San Francisco in 1948 and at Geneva in 1951.

References

External links
 Official Biographical Sketch in Lok Sabha Website

1913 births
1972 deaths
Indian National Congress politicians from West Bengal
Lok Sabha members from West Bengal
India MPs 1952–1957